Razzaqabad is one of the neighborhoods of Liaquatabad Town in Karachi, Sindh, Pakistan.

Demography
There are several ethnic groups in Razzaqabad including Urdu,   
Sindhis, Muhajir, Punjabis, Kashmiris, Seraikis, Pakhtuns, Balochs, Brahuis, Memons etc.

References

External links 
 Karachi Website.

Neighbourhoods of Karachi